Andrzej Opaliński (1575–1623), of Łodzia coat of arms, was a Polish–Lithuanian nobleman and Catholic priest. Bishop of Poznań from 1607 till his death in 1623.

Son of the Great and Court Crown Marshal, Andrzej Opaliński (1540–1593).

Supporter of king Sigismund III Vasa.

Andrzej Opalinski (1575-1623)
1575 births
1623 deaths
17th-century Roman Catholic bishops in the Polish–Lithuanian Commonwealth